The 1882 United States House of Representatives elections were held for the most part on November 7, 1882, with five states holding theirs early between June and October. They occurred during President Chester A. Arthur's term. Elections were held for 325 seats of the United States House of Representatives, representing 38 states, to serve in the 48th United States Congress. They were the first elections after reapportionment following the 1880 United States Census, increasing the size of the House. Special elections were also held throughout the year.

Arthur's Republican Party was badly defeated, losing its majority to the opposition Democratic Party after a campaign that focused on the resistance of Republican leaders to reforming the Spoils system under which government jobs were handed to supporters of winning candidates. After the election, Arthur agreed with the Democrats to pass the Pendleton Civil Service Reform Act, establishing a professional civil service.  However, his actions were too late, as the image of the Republican Party as corrupt was already engrained in the minds of voters.  This election also saw the decline of the pro-paper money Greenback Party, and the pick up of several Virginian seats by the Readjuster Party which promoted fiscal responsibility and shunned elitism, though the Virginia-based Readjuster Party all but disappeared following this election.

Election summaries
Following the 1880 Census, 32 new seats were apportioned. Three States lost 1 seat each, 13 States had no change in apportionment, 14 States gained 1 seat each, 6 States gained 2 seats, 1 State gained 4 seats, and 1 State gained 5 seats. Several States that gained one or more seats did not redistrict immediately, electing the new members at-large, while one state (Maine) which lost a member also delayed redistricting, electing all of its members at-large for this Congress only.

There were 8 members elected from third parties, 4 from the Virginia-based Readjuster Party, 2 from the declining Greenback Party, and 2 Independents. The previous election of 1880 had had 10 Greenbacks and 1 Independent.

Early election dates 
Five states, with 39 seats among them, held elections before the others:

 June 5, 1882: Oregon
 September 5, 1882: Vermont
 September 8, 1882: Maine
 October 10, 1882: Iowa and Ohio

Special elections 
There were four special elections in 1882 during the 47th United States Congress.

Elections are listed by date and district.

|-
! 
| Thomas Allen
|  | Democratic
| 1880
|  | Incumbent died April 8, 1882.New member elected November 7, 1882 and seated December 15, 1882.Republican gain.Winner lost election the same day to the next term in the redistricted , see below.
| nowrap | 

|-
! 
| Robert M. A. Hawk
|  | Republican
| 1878
|  | Incumbent died June 29, 1882.New member elected November 7, 1882 and seated December 4, 1882.Republican hold.
| nowrap | 

|-
! 
| George Q. Cannon
|  | Republican
| 1872
|  | Incumbent disqualified on account of polygamy.New delegate elected November 7, 1882 and seated December 4, 1882.Democratic gain.Winner also elected to the next term, see below.
| nowrap | 

|-
! 
| Alexander H. Stephens
|  | Democratic
| 18421859 1872
|  | Incumbent resigned November 4, 1882 to become Governor of Georgia.New member elected November 8, 1882 and seated December 4, 1882.Democratic hold.Winner also elected to the next term.
| nowrap | 

|}

Alabama 

|-
! 
| Thomas H. Herndon
| 
| 1878
| Incumbent re-elected.
| nowrap | 

|-
! 
| Hilary A. Herbert
| 
| 1876
| Incumbent re-elected.
| nowrap | 

|-
! 
| William C. Oates
| 
| 1880
| Incumbent re-elected.
| nowrap | 

|-
! rowspan=2 | 
| rowspan=2 colspan=3 | Vacant
|  | Rep. Charles M. Shelley (D) resigned July 20, 1882 after election contest.New member elected.Democratic hold.
| nowrap | 
|-
|  | Election successfully contested.New member seated January 9, 1885.Republican gain.
| nowrap | 

|-
! 
| Thomas Williams
| 
| 1878
| Incumbent re-elected.
| nowrap | 

|-
! 
| Goldsmith W. Hewitt
| 
| 1880
| Incumbent re-elected.
| nowrap | 

|-
! 
| William H. Forney
| 
| 1874
| Incumbent re-elected.
| nowrap | 

|-
! 
| colspan=3 | Vacant
|  | Rep. William M. Lowe (G) died October 12, 1882.New member elected.Democratic gain.
| nowrap | 

|}

Arkansas 

|-
! 
| Poindexter Dunn
| 
| 1878
| Incumbent re-elected.
| nowrap | 

|-
! 
| James K. Jones
| 
| 1880
| Incumbent re-elected.
| nowrap | 

|-
! 
| Jordan E. Cravens
| 
| 1876
|  | Incumbent lost renomination.New member elected.Democratic hold.
| nowrap | 

|-
! 
| Thomas M. Gunter
| 
| 1872
|  | Incumbent retired.New member elected.Democratic hold.
| nowrap | 

|-
! 
| colspan=3 | None 
|  | New seat.New member elected.Democratic gain.
| nowrap | 

|}

California 

|-
! 
| William Rosecrans
|  | Democratic
| 1880
| Incumbent re-elected.
| nowrap | 

|-
! 
| Horace F. Page
|  | Republican
| 1872
|  | Incumbent lost re-election.New member elected.Democratic gain.
| nowrap | 

|-
! 
| Campbell P. Berry
|  | Democratic
| 1879
|  | Incumbent retired.New member elected.Democratic hold.
| nowrap | 

|-
! 
| Romualdo Pacheco
|  | Republican
| 1876
|  | Incumbent retired.New member elected.Democratic gain.
| nowrap | 

|-
! rowspan=2 | 
| colspan=3 | None (New seat)
|  | New seat.New member elected.Democratic gain.
| rowspan=2 nowrap | 

|-
| colspan=3 | None (New seat)
|  | New seat.New member elected.Democratic gain.

|}

Colorado 

|-
! 
| James B. Belford
| 
| 1878
| Incumbent re-elected.
| nowrap | 

|}

Connecticut 

|-
! 
| John R. Buck
| 
| 1880
|  | Incumbent lost re-election.New member elected.Democratic gain.
| nowrap | 

|-
! 
| James Phelps
| 
| 1875
|  | Incumbent retired.New member elected.Democratic hold.
| nowrap | 

|-
! 
| John T. Wait
| 
| 1876 
| Incumbent re-elected.
| nowrap | 

|-
! 
| Frederick Miles
| 
| 1878
|  | Incumbent retired.New member elected.Democratic gain.
| nowrap | 

|}

Delaware 

|-
! 
| Edward L. Martin
| 
| 1878
|  | Incumbent retired.New member elected.Democratic hold.
| nowrap | 

|}

Florida 

|-
! 
| Robert H. M. Davidson
|  | Democratic
| 1876
| Incumbent re-elected.
| nowrap | 

|-
! 
| Horatio Bisbee Jr.
|  | Republican
| 1880
| Incumbent re-elected.
| nowrap | 

|}

Georgia 

|-
! 

|-
! 

|-
! 

|-
! 

|-
! 

|-
! 

|-
! 

|-
! 

|-
! 

|-
! 

|}

Illinois 

|-
! 

|-
! 

|-
! 

|-
! 

|-
! 

|-
! 

|-
! 

|-
! 

|-
! 

|-
! 

|-
! 

|-
! 

|-
! 

|-
! 

|-
! 

|-
! 

|-
! 

|-
! 

|-
! 

|-
! 

|}

Indiana 

|-
! 

|-
! 

|-
! 

|-
! 

|-
! 

|-
! 

|-
! 

|-
! 

|-
! 

|-
! 

|-
! 

|-
! 

|-
! 

|}

Iowa 

|-
! 

|-
! 

|-
! 

|-
! 

|-
! 

|-
! 

|-
! 

|-
! 

|-
! 

|-
! 

|-
! 

|}

Kansas 

|-
! 
| John A. Anderson
| 
| 1878
| Incumbent re-elected.
| nowrap | 

|-
! 
| Dudley C. Haskell
| 
| 1876
| Incumbent re-elected.
| nowrap | 

|-
! 
| Thomas Ryan
| 
| 1876
| Incumbent re-elected.
| nowrap | 

|-
! rowspan=4 | 
| colspan=3 | None (New seat)
|  | New seat.New member elected.Republican gain.
| rowspan=4 nowrap | 
|-
| colspan=3 | None (New seat)
|  | New seat.New member elected.Republican gain.
|-
| colspan=3 | None (New seat)
|  | New seat.New member elected.Republican gain.
|-
| colspan=3 | None (New seat)
|  | New seat.New member elected.Republican gain.

|}

Kentucky 

|-
! 

|-
! 

|-
! 

|-
! 

|-
! 

|-
! 

|-
! 

|-
! 

|-
! 

|-
! 

|-
! 

|}

Louisiana 

|-
! 

|-
! 

|-
! 

|-
! 

|-
! 

|-
! 

|}

Maine 

|-
! rowspan=5 | 
| Thomas B. Reed
| 
| 1876
| Incumbent re-elected.
| rowspan=5 nowrap | 
|-
| Nelson Dingley Jr.
| 
| 1881 
| Incumbent re-elected.
|-
| Stephen Lindsey
| 
| 1876
|  | Incumbent retired.New member elected.Republican hold.
|-
| George W. Ladd
|  | Greenback
| 1878
|  | Incumbent lost re-election.New member elected.Republican gain.
|-
| Thompson H. Murch
|  | Greenback
| 1878
|  | Incumbent lost re-election.Greenback loss.

|}

Maryland 

|-
! 

|-
! 

|-
! 

|-
! 

|-
! 

|-
! 

|}

Massachusetts 

|-
! 
| William W. Crapo
|  | Republican
| 1874
|  | Incumbent retired.New member elected.Republican hold.
| nowrap | 

|-
! 
| Benjamin W. Harris
|  | Republican
| 1872
|  | Incumbent retired.New member elected.Republican hold.
| nowrap | 

|-
! 
| Ambrose A. Ranney
|  | Republican
| 1880
| Incumbent re-elected.
| nowrap | 

|-
! 
| colspan=3 | Vacant (new seat)
|  | Vacant seat.New member elected.Democratic gain.
| nowrap | 

|-
! rowspan=2 | 
|  | Democratic
| 1876
| Incumbent re-elected.
| rowspan=2 nowrap | 

|-
| Selwyn Z. Bowman
|  | Republican
| 1878
|  | Incumbent lost re-election.Republican loss.

|-
! 
| colspan=3 | Vacant (new seat)
|  | New member elected.Democratic gain.
| nowrap | 

|-
! 
|  | Republican
| 1880
| Incumbent re-elected.
| nowrap | 

|-
! 
|  | Republican
| 1878
| Incumbent re-elected.
| nowrap | 

|-
! 
|  | Republican
| 1880
|  | Incumbent lost re-election.New member elected.Independent Republican gain.
| nowrap | 
|-
! 
|  | Republican
| 1876
| Incumbent re-elected.
| nowrap | 
|-
! 
|  | Republican
| 1876
|  | Incumbent retired.New member elected.Republican hold.
| nowrap | 
|-
! 
|  | Republican
| 1876
| Incumbent re-elected.
| nowrap | 
|}

Michigan 

|-
! 

|-
! 

|-
! 

|-
! 

|-
! 

|-
! 

|-
! 

|-
! 

|-
! 

|-
! 

|-
! 

|}

Minnesota 

|-
! 
| Mark H. Dunnell
| 
| 1870
|  | Incumbent retired to run for U.S. Senator.New member elected.Republican hold.
| nowrap | 

|-
! 
| colspan=3 | None 
|  | New seat.New member elected.Republican gain.
| nowrap | 

|-
! 
| Horace B. Strait
| 
| 1880
| Incumbent re-elected.
| nowrap | 

|-
! 
| William D. Washburn
| 
| 1878
| Incumbent re-elected.
| nowrap | 

|-
! 
| colspan=3 | None 
|  | New seat.New member elected.Republican gain.
| nowrap | 

|}

Mississippi 

|-
! 
| Henry L. Muldrow
|  | Democratic
| 1876
| Incumbent re-elected.
| nowrap | 

|-
! rowspan=2 | 
| rowspan=2 | Van. H. Manning
| rowspan=2  | Democratic
| rowspan=2 | 1876
| Incumbent re-elected.
| nowrap | 
|-
|  | Election successfully contested in 1884.Results corrected.Independent gain.
| nowrap | 

|-
! 
| Hernando Money
|  | Democratic
| 1874
|  | Incumbent redistricted to the .New member elected.Republican gain.
| nowrap | 

|-
! rowspan=2 | 
| Otho R. Singleton
|  | Democratic
| 1874
|  | Incumbent redistricted to the .New member elected.Democratic hold.
| nowrap rowspan=2 | 
|-
| Hernando Money
|  | Democratic
| 1874

|-
! rowspan=2 | 
| Charles E. Hooker
|  | Democratic
| 1874
|  | Incumbent retired.New member elected.Democratic hold.
| nowrap rowspan=2 | 
|-
| Otho R. Singleton
|  | Democratic
| 1874

|-
! 
| John R. Lynch
|  | Republican
| 1880
|  | Incumbent lost re-election.New member elected.Democratic gain.
| nowrap | 

|-
! 
| colspan=3 | None (new district)
|  | New member elected.Democratic gain.
| nowrap | 

|}

Missouri 

Missouri gained one seat in reapportionment.  After redistricting and the new elections, the delegation went from 7 Democrats,  4 Greenbacks, and 2 Republicans, to a solid slate of 14 Democrats. 

|-
! 
| William H. Hatch
|  | Democratic
| 1878
| Incumbent re-elected.
| nowrap | 

|-
! 
| colspan=3 | New district
|  | New seat.New member elected.Democratic gain.
| nowrap | 

|-
! 
| Joseph H. Burrows
|  | Greenback
| 1880
|  | Incumbent lost re-election.New member elected.Democratic gain.
| nowrap | 

|-
! 
| Nicholas Ford
|  | Greenback
| 1878
|  | Incumbent lost re-election.New member elected.Democratic gain.
| nowrap | 

|-
! rowspan=2 | 
| Theron Moses Rice
|  | Greenback
| 1880
|  | Incumbent retired.New member elected.Democratic gain.
| rowspan=2 nowrap | 

|-
| Robert T. Van Horn
|  | Republican
| 18641870 1880
|  | Incumbent retired.Republican loss.

|-
! 
| colspan=3 | New district
|  | New seat.New member elected.Democratic gain.
| nowrap | 

|-
! 
| Aylett Hawes Buckner
|  | Democratic
| 1872
| Incumbent re-elected.
| nowrap | 

|-
! 
| Gustavus Sessinghaus 
|  | Republican
| 1882 
|  | Incumbent lost re-election.New member elected.Democratic gain.
| nowrap | 

|-
! 
| Thomas Allen
|  | Democratic
| 1880
|  | Incumbent died April 8, 1882.New member elected.Democratic hold.Winner was not elected to finish the current term in the old district.
| nowrap | 

|-
! 
| Martin L. Clardy
|  | Democratic
| 1878
| Incumbent re-elected.
| nowrap | 

|-
! rowspan=2 | 
| Richard P. Bland
|  | Democratic
| 1872
| Incumbent re-elected.
| rowspan=2 nowrap | 

|-
| John Bullock Clark Jr.
|  | Democratic
| 1872
|  | Incumbent lost renomination.Democratic loss.

|-
! 
| colspan=3 | New district
|  | New seat.New member elected.Democratic gain.
| nowrap | 

|-
! 
| Ira Sherwin Hazeltine
|  | Greenback
| 1880
|  | Incumbent lost re-election.New member elected.Democratic gain.
| nowrap | 

|-
! 
| Lowndes Henry Davis
|  | Democratic
| 1878
| Incumbent re-elected.
| nowrap | 

|}

Nebraska 

|-
! 
| colspan=3 | None 
|  | New seat.New member elected.Republican gain.
| nowrap | 

|-
! 
| colspan=3 | None 
|  | New seat.New member elected.Republican gain.
| nowrap | 

|-
! 
| Edward K. Valentine
|  | Republican 
| 1878
| Incumbent re-elected.
| nowrap | 

|}

Nevada 

|-
! 
| George W. Cassidy
| 
| 1880
| Incumbent re-elected.
| nowrap | 

|}

New Hampshire 

|-
! 
| Joshua G. Hall
| 
| 1878
|  | Incumbent retired.New member elected.Republican hold.
| nowrap | 

|-
! rowspan=2 | 
| James F. Briggs
| 
| 1877
|  | Incumbent retired.Republican loss.
| rowspan=2 nowrap | 
|-
| Ossian Ray
| 
| 1880 
| Incumbent re-elected.

|}

New Jersey 

|-
! 

|-
! 

|-
! 

|-
! 

|-
! 

|-
! 

|-
! 

|}

New York 

|-
! 

|-
! 

|-
! 

|-
! 

|-
! 

|-
! 

|-
! 

|-
! 

|-
! 

|-
! 

|-
! 

|-
! 

|-
! 

|-
! 

|-
! 

|-
! 

|-
! 

|-
! 

|-
! 

|-
! 

|-
! 

|-
! 

|-
! 

|-
! 

|-
! 

|-
! 

|-
! 

|-
! 

|-
! 

|-
! 

|-
! 

|-
! 

|-
! 

|-
! 

|}

North Carolina 

The Liberal Anti-Prohibition Party was formed following the failure of the first statewide referendum on Prohibition in 1881. Throughout most of North Carolina, the moribund Republican Party merged into the new party and scored impressive gains in the 1882 elections. By early 1884, however, the LAP was dissolving, and they are listed here synonymously with the Republican Party.

|-
! 
| Louis C. Latham
|  | Democratic
| 1880
|  | Incumbent lost re-election.New member elected.Republican gain.
| nowrap | 

|-
! 
| Orlando Hubbs
|  | Republican
| 1880
|  | Incumbent retired.New member elected.Republican hold.
| nowrap | 

|-
! 
| John W. Shackelford
|  | Democratic
| 1880
|  | Incumbent died January 18, 1883.New member elected.Democratic hold.
| nowrap | 

|-
! 
| William Ruffin Cox
|  | Democratic
| 1880
| Incumbent re-elected.
| nowrap | 

|-
! 
| Alfred M. Scales
|  | Democratic
| 1874
| Incumbent re-elected.
| nowrap | 

|-
! 
| Clement Dowd
|  | Democratic
| 1880
| Incumbent re-elected.
| nowrap | 

|-
! 
| Robert F. Armfield
|  | Democratic
| 1878
|  | Incumbent lost renomination.New member elected.Republican gain.
| nowrap | 

|-
! 
| Robert B. Vance
|  | Democratic
| 1872
| Incumbent re-elected.
| nowrap | 

|-
! 
| colspan=3 | None (District created)
|  | New seat.New member elected.Democratic gain.
| nowrap | 

|}

Ohio 

|-
! 

|-
! 

|-
! 

|-
! 

|-
! 

|-
! 

|-
! 

|-
! 

|-
! 

|-
! 

|-
! 

|-
! 

|-
! 

|-
! 

|-
! 

|-
! 

|-
! 

|-
! 

|-
! 

|-
! 

|-
! 

|}

Oregon 

|-
! 
| Melvin C. George
| 
| 1880
| Incumbent re-elected.
| nowrap | 

|}

Pennsylvania 

|-
! 

|-
! 

|-
! 

|-
! 

|-
! 

|-
! 

|-
! 

|-
! 

|-
! 

|-
! 

|-
! 

|-
! 

|-
! 

|-
! 

|-
! 

|-
! 

|-
! 

|-
! 

|-
! 

|-
! 

|-
! 

|-
! 

|-
! 

|-
! 

|-
! 

|-
! 

|-
! 

|-
! 

|}

Rhode Island 

|-
! 
| Henry J. Spooner
| 
| 1881 
| Incumbent re-elected.
| nowrap | 

|-
! 
| Jonathan Chace
| 
| 1880
| Incumbent re-elected.
| nowrap | 

|}

South Carolina 

|-
! 
| John S. Richardson
|  | Democratic
| 1878
|  | Incumbent retired.New member elected.Democratic hold.
| nowrap | 

|-
! 
| George D. Tillman
|  | Democratic
| 1878
| Incumbent re-elected.
| nowrap | 

|-
! 
| D. Wyatt Aiken
|  | Democratic
| 1876
| Incumbent re-elected.
| nowrap | 

|-
! 
| John H. Evins
|  | Democratic
| 1876
| Incumbent re-elected.
| nowrap | 

|-
! 
| colspan=3 | None (open seat)
|  | New seat.New member elected.Democratic hold.
| nowrap | 

|-
! 
| colspan=3 | None (District created)
|  | New seat.New member elected.Democratic gain.
| nowrap | 

|-
! 
| colspan=3 | None (District created)
|  | New seat.New member elected.Republican gain.
| nowrap | 

|}

Tennessee  

|-
! 
| Augustus H. Pettibone
|  | Republican
| 1880
| Incumbent re-elected.
| nowrap | 

|-
! 
| Leonidas C. Houk
|  | Republican
| 1878
| Incumbent re-elected.
| nowrap | 

|-
! 
| George G. Dibrell
|  | Democratic
| 1874
| Incumbent re-elected.
| nowrap | 

|-
! 
| Benton McMillin
|  | Democratic
| 1878
| Incumbent re-elected.
|  nowrap | 

|-
! 
| Richard Warner
|  | Democratic
| 1880
| Incumbent re-elected.
| nowrap | 

|-
! 
| John F. House
|  | Democratic
| 1874
|  |Incumbent retired.New member elected.Democratic hold.
| nowrap | 

|-
! 
| Washington C. Whitthorne
|  | Democratic
| 1870
|  |Incumbent retired.New member elected.Democratic hold.
| nowrap | 

|-
! 
| John D. C. Atkins
|  | Democratic
| 1872
|  |Incumbent retired.New member elected.Democratic hold.
| nowrap | 

|-
! 
| Charles B. Simonton
|  | Democratic
| 1878
|  |Incumbent retired.New member elected.Democratic hold.
| nowrap | 

|-
! 
| William R. Moore
|  | Republican
| 1880
|  |Incumbent retired.New member elected.Democratic gain.
| 

|}

Texas 

|-
! 

|-
! 

|-
! 

|-
! 

|-
! 

|-
! 

|-
! 

|-
! 

|-
! 

|-
! 

|-
! 

|}

Vermont 

|-
! 
| Charles H. Joyce
| 
| 1874
|  | Incumbent retired.New member elected.Republican hold.
| nowrap | 

|-
! rowspan=2 | 
| James M. Tyler
| 
| 1878
|  | Incumbent retired.New member elected.Republican hold.
| rowspan=2 nowrap | 
|-
| William W. Grout
| 
| 1880
|  | Incumbent lost renomination.Republican loss.

|}

Virginia 

|-
! 

|-
! 

|-
! 

|-
! 

|-
! 

|-
! 

|-
! 

|-
! 

|-
! 

|-
! 

|}

West Virginia 

|-
! 
| Benjamin Wilson
|  | Democratic
| 1874
|  | Incumbent retired.New member elected.Republican gain.
| nowrap | 

|-
! 
| John B. Hoge
|  | Democratic
| 1880
|  | Incumbent retired.New member elected.Democratic hold.
| nowrap | 

|-
! 
| John E. Kenna
|  | Democratic
| 1876
| Incumbent re-elected.
| nowrap | 

|-
! 
| colspan=3 | Vacant (new district)
|  | New member elected.Democratic gain.
| nowrap | 

|}

Wisconsin 

Wisconsin elected nine members of congress on Election Day, November 7, 1882.  One seat was newly added in reapportionment after the 1880 census.

|-
! 
| Charles G. Williams
|  | Republican
| 1872
| |  Incumbent lost re-election.New member elected.Democratic gain.
| nowrap | 

|-
! 
| Lucien B. Caswell
|  | Republican
| 1874
|  | Incumbent was redistricted to the 1st district.New member elected.Democratic gain.
| nowrap | 

|-
! 
| George C. Hazelton
|  | Republican
| 1876
| |  Incumbent lost re-election.New member elected.Democratic gain.
| nowrap | 

|-
! 
| Peter V. Deuster
|  | Democratic
| 1878
| Incumbent re-elected.
| nowrap | 

|-
! 
| Edward S. Bragg
|  | Democratic
| 1876
|  | Incumbent was redistricted to the 2nd district.New member elected.Democratic hold.
| nowrap | 

|-
! 
| Richard W. Guenther
|  | Republican
| 1880
| Incumbent re-elected.
| nowrap | 

|-
! 
| Herman L. Humphrey
|  | Republican
| 1876
|  | Incumbent was redistricted to the 8th district.New member elected.Democratic gain.
| nowrap | 

|-
! 
| Thaddeus C. Pound
|  | Republican
| 1876
|  | Incumbent retired.New member elected.Republican hold.
| nowrap | 

|-
! 
| colspan="3" | New district.
|  | New district.New member elected.Republican gain.
| nowrap | 

|}

Non-voting delegates 

|-
! 
| Granville H. Oury
|  | Democratic
| 1880
| Incumbent re-elected.
| nowrap | 

|-
! 
| Richard F. Pettigrew
|  | Republican
| 1880
|  | Incumbent lost re-election.New delegate elected.Republican hold.
| nowrap | 

|-
! 
| George Ainslie
|  | Democratic
| 1878
|  | Incumbent lost re-election.New delegate elected.Republican gain.
| nowrap | 

|-
! 
| Martin Maginnis
|  | Democratic
| 1872
| Incumbent re-elected.
| nowrap | 

|-
! 
| Tranqulino Luna
|  | Republican
| 1880
| Incumbent re-elected.
| nowrap | 

|-
! 
| George Q. Cannon
|  | Republican
| 1872
|  | Incumbent disqualified on account of polygamy.New delegate elected.Democratic gain.Winner also elected to finish the current term, see above.
| nowrap | 

|-
! 
| Thomas H. Brents
|  | Republican
| 1878
| Incumbent re-elected.
| nowrap | 

|-
! 
| Morton E. Post
|  | Democratic
| 1880
| Incumbent re-elected.
| nowrap | 

|}

See also
 1882 United States elections
 1882–83 United States Senate elections
 47th United States Congress
 48th United States Congress

Notes

References

Bibliography
 Republican Congressional Committee, The Republican Campaign Text Book for 1882 (1882).

External links
 Office of the Historian (Office of Art & Archives, Office of the Clerk, U.S. House of Representatives)